Simulated Electronic Launch Minuteman (SELM) is a method used by the United States Air Force to verify the reliability of the LGM-30 Minuteman intercontinental ballistic missile. SELM replaces key components at the Launch Control Center to allow a physical "keyturn" by missile combat crew members. This test allows end-to-end verification in the ICBM launch process.

Logistics Support
The Air Force Nuclear Weapons Center, Intercontinental Ballistic Missile (ICBM) Systems Directorate at Hill AFB, Utah provides technical support to SELM tests The information obtained from tests provide a complete assessment of the weapon systems for Air Force Global Strike Command (AFGSC).

Chronology
1974
?? ??? - 44 SMW is selected to host "Giant Pace Test 74-1," the first SELM exercise. Eleven sorties underwent successful simulated launch from LCC and ALCS.

See also
Simulated Electronic Launch Peacekeeper - similar verification test performed on LGM-118A Peacekeeper

References

Nuclear warfare
Cold War military equipment of the United States
United States nuclear command and control
United States Air Force
1974 in science
1974 in military history